The Czech Republic–Slovakia ice hockey rivalry is a highly competitive sports rivalry that exists between the national ice hockey teams of the two countries, as well as their respective sets of fans. Games between the two teams, even those that are only friendly matches, are often marked by notable and sometimes controversial incidents. These matches are also called "Federal derby."

List of matches

Statistics 
(as of February 2014)

Games 
This list contains only Ice Hockey World Championships and Olympic Games encounters.

See also 
 Czechoslovakia national ice hockey team
 Czech Republic national ice hockey team
 Slovakia national ice hockey team
 Czech Republic–Slovakia football rivalry

References

Ice hockey rivalries
Sports rivalries